The Czech Suite in D major, Op. 39 (B. 93), was composed by Antonín Dvořák in 1879 and published later in his life. Adolf Čech conducted the premiere.

Dvořák had only recently become introduced to Fritz Simrock by Johannes Brahms but had already become displeased with several of his new publisher's business practices, including releasing older works with high opus numbers, implying they were new. He offered this work, recently written, to Simrock with a somewhat earlier number (that of works he'd written a few years before) as part of his response.

The suite consists of five movements as follows:

References

External links 
 Work details antonin-dvorak.cz (in English)
 
 , NDR Sinfonieorchester, John Eliot Gardiner

Suites by Antonín Dvořák
1879 compositions
Compositions for symphony orchestra
Compositions in D major